Usta Murad Mosque, was a Tunisian mosque located in the medina of Tunis.
It does not exist anymore.

Localization
The mosque was located in El Hokam Street.

Etymology
It got its name from its founder, the Muradid Dey Usta Murad who founded the Ghar el Melh harbor Porto Farina.

History
The mosque was built between 1637 and 1640, which was the Usta Murad's reign period.

References 

Mosques in Tunis
17th-century mosques